The Pillot Building, located at 1006 Congress Avenue in Downtown Houston, Texas, was listed on the National Register of Historic Places on June 13, 1974. However, the structure suffered severe damage in the 1980s and collapsed during reconstruction in 1988. A replica of the original building, incorporating some of the original cast iron columns, sills, and lintels, was completed in 1990. The replica was removed from the National Register of Historic Places in 1994.

The building was constructed between 1857 and 1869 by Eugene Pillot (1820-1896), and served a variety of tenants including a dry good merchant and professional offices.  It was notable for cast iron front structure.

See also
 National Register of Historic Places listings in Harris County, Texas

References

Commercial buildings completed in 1857
Commercial buildings on the National Register of Historic Places in Texas
Former National Register of Historic Places in Texas
National Register of Historic Places in Houston